Cobbetts LLP was a full service British corporate law firm, with offices in Birmingham, Leeds, London and Manchester. Its main areas of work were dispute resolution, real estate, corporate and employment law. It had particular expertise in acting for mining companies looking to float on AIM.

Cobbetts had total revenues of £45.4 million in 2011/12, the 62nd-largest of any UK-based law firm in that financial year. Cobbetts entered administration in January 2013 and in February the bulk of its assets were acquired by rival Manchester-based law firm DWF LLP.

History
Cobbetts was founded in Manchester during the first half of the nineteenth century as Cobbett, Wheeler and Cobbett by the sons of William Cobbett, the journalist and polemicist. It became Cobbett Leak Almond after the acquisition of Leak Almond and Parkinson in 1987. The firm shortened its name to simply 'Cobbetts' in 1996.

Further mergers with Read Hind Stewart of Leeds and Lee Crowder of Birmingham followed in 2002 and 2004 respectively. The London office was opened in 2004 to service corporate clients acquired through niche Manchester firm Fox Brooks Marshall in 2003.

On 30 January 2013 it was announced that Cobbetts would be entering administration, having filed a notice of intention to appoint administrators on 28 January 2013, and was now up for sale.

On 31 January 2013 it was announced that the Manchester-based law firm DWF had agreed to acquire the bulk of Cobbetts' assets in a "pre-pack" transaction. The acquisition was completed on 7 February 2013. Cobbetts' finance litigation practice and debt recovery team Incasso did not form part of the acquisition, with the former moving to Leeds-based firm Walker Morris and the latter being acquired by the Redditch-based debt recovery firm HL Legal.

References

Law firms of the United Kingdom
Law firms established in the 19th century
19th-century establishments in the United Kingdom
Defunct law firms of the United Kingdom
Law firms disestablished in 2013
2013 disestablishments in the United Kingdom